

Belgium
Belgian Congo – Pierre Ryckmans, Governor-General of the Belgian Congo (1934–1946)

France
 French Somaliland – 
 Armand Léon Annet, Governor of French Somaliland (1935–1937)
 Marie François Julien Pierre-Alype, Governor of French Somaliland (1937–1938)
 Guinea – 
 Louis Placide Blacher, Governor of Guinea (1936–1937)
 Pierre Tap, acting Governor of Guinea (1937–1938)

Japan
 Karafuto – Takeshi Imamura, Governor-General of Karafuto (5 July 1932 – 7 May 1938)
 Korea – Jirō Minami, Governor-General of Korea (1936–1942)
 Taiwan – Seizō Kobayashi, Governor-General of Taiwan (June 1936 – November 1940)

Portugal
 Angola – António Lopes Matheus, High Commissioner of Angola (1935–1939)

United Kingdom
 The Bahamas
 Sir Charles Dundas, Governor of The Bahamas (1934–1940)
 Barbados
 Sir Mark Aitchison Young, Governor of Barbados (1933–1938)
 Bechuanaland
 Sir Charles Fernand Rey, Resident Commissioner (1930–1937)
 Sir Charles Noble Arden-Clarke, Resident Commissioner (1937–1942)
 British Guiana
 Sir Geoffry Northcote, Governor of British Guiana (1935–1937)
 Sir Wilfrid Edward Francis Jackson, Governor of British Guiana (1937–1941)
 British Leeward Islands
 Sir Gordon James Lethem, Governor of the British Leeward Islands (1936–1941)
 British Windward Islands
 Sir Selwyn MacGregor Grier, Governor of the British Windward Islands (1935–1937)
 Sir Henry Bradshaw Popham, Governor of the British Windward Islands (1937–1942)
 Ceylon
 Sir Reginald Edward Stubbs, Governor of Ceylon (1933–1937)
 Sir Andrew Caldecott, Governor of Ceylon (1937–1944)
 Cyprus
 Sir Herbert Richmond Palmer, Governor of Cyprus (1933–1939)
 Hong Kong
 Sir Andrew Caldecott, Governor of Hong Kong (1935–1937)
 Sir Geoffry Northcote, Governor of Hong Kong (1937–1941)
 India
 The Marquess of Linlithgow, Viceroy of India (1936–1943)
 Jamaica
 Sir Edward Brandis Denham, Governor of Jamaica (1935–1938)
 Kenya
 Armigel de Vins Wade, Governor of Kenya (1936–1937)
 Sir Robert Brooke-Popham, Governor of Kenya (1937–1939)
 Malta Colony
Charles Bonham-Carter, Governor of Malta (1936–1940)
 Nigeria
 Sir Bernard Henry Bourdillon, Governor of Nigeria (1935–1940)
 Northern Rhodesia
 Sir Hubert Winthrop Young, Governor of Northern Rhodesia (1935–1938)
 Nyasaland
 Sir Harold Baxter Kittermaster, Governor of Nyasaland (1934–1939)
 Straits Settlements
 Sir Shenton Thomas, Governor of the Straits Settlements (1934–1942)
 Trinidad and Tobago
 Sir Arthur George Murchison Fletcher, Governor of Trinidad and Tobago (1936–1938)
 Uganda Protectorate
 Sir Philip Euen Mitchell, Governor of Uganda (1935–1940)

Colonial governors
Colonial governors
1937